Ernest Prakasa (born in Jakarta, Indonesia, January 29, 1982) is an Indonesian comedian, stand up performer, writer, and actor. He became popular after receiving third place in Stand Up Comedy Indonesia (SUCI) in 2011. He is known as a Chinese-Indonesian comedian who often uses his ethnic background as a standup comedy subject. Ernest obtained his degree from Padjadjaran University, majoring in International Relations.

Television 

 Stand Up Comedy Show (Metro TV)
 Stand Up Comedy Indonesia (Kompas TV) as contestant on 2011, host on 2014
 Comic Action (Kompas TV)
 Indonesia Harus Buka (Kompas TV)
 Stand Up Comedy Academy (Indosiar) as judge on 2015

Filmography 

 Make Money (2013)
 Comic 8 (2014)
 Kukejar Cinta ke Negeri Cina (2014)
 CJR The Movie (2015)
 Comic 8: Casino Kings (2015)
 Ngenest The Movie (2015)
 Sundul Gan: The Story of Kaskus (2016)
 Jagoan Instan (2016)
 Koala Kumal (2016)
 Rudy Habibie (2016)
 Cek Toko Sebelah (2016)
 Filosofi Kopi 2 (2017)
 Stip & Pensil (2017)
 Susah Sinyal (2017)
 Sesuai Aplikasi (2018)
 Milly & Mamet (2018)
 Imperfect (2019)
 Cek Toko Sebelah 2 (2022)

Series 
 Cek Toko Sebelah The Series (2019)
 Cek Toko Sebelah The Series 2 (2020)
 Imperfect The Series (2021)

Works 

 
 
 Ernest Prakasa & The Oriental Bandits (2013) (DVD)
 Illucinati (2014) (DVD)
 XL 2econd Chance (2014–2015) (Youtube miniseries)
 *
 Prakasa, Ernest (2015). Ngenest 3 – Ngetawain Hidup Ala Ernest.

Accolades

References

External links 
 
 
 Ernest prakasa on yomamen

1982 births
Living people
People from Jakarta
Indonesian male comedians
Indonesian comedians
Indonesian people of Chinese descent
Indonesian actors
Indonesian writers